Van Duyne House may refer to:

in Montville, New Jersey and listed on the National Register of Historic Places in Morris County, New Jersey:
 James Van Duyne Farmhouse
 Martin Van Duyne House
 Simon Van Duyne House
 Van Duyne–Jacobus House

Other locations:
 Mead–Van Duyne House, Wayne, New Jersey, formerly listed on the National Register of Historic Places in Passaic County, New Jersey